KYGL (106.3 FM) is a radio station broadcasting a classic rock format. Licensed to Texarkana, Arkansas, United States, it serves the Texarkana area. The station is currently owned by Townsquare Media.  Studios are located on Arkansas Boulevard in Texarkana, Arkansas and its transmitter is southeast of the city.

External links
KYGL Eagle 106.3 Official Website

YGL
Classic rock radio stations in the United States
Townsquare Media radio stations
Radio stations established in 1990
1990 establishments in Arkansas